Eileen Browne, (5 August 1923 – 14 April 1999) was a BBC Radio  broadcaster, perhaps best known for being one of the original presenters of Listen with Mother.

Born in Edinburgh, her parents were Minnie Gallaugher and Professor Francis James Browne, both originally from Donegal.  Eileen studied at the Royal College of Music for 18 months with the piano as her first instrument. After working in precision engineering during the war, she wrote to the BBC asking if there were any vacancies in the schools music department and she was given temporary employment as a junior programme assistant, which later became permanent. During the next seven years her assignments included Music And Movement, Music Box and orchestral concerts. She also wrote the script for a series of on the lives of great composers called Adventures In Music.

For Listen With Mother she recorded the traditional nursery rhymes with George Dixon in 1950, when the programme began. She was also responsible for choosing the wide variety of music that opened each programme. The closing music, the Berceuse from Faure's Dolly Suite for piano duet, was recorded by Eileen and Roger Fiske.

She left the BBC in July 1953 shortly after her first marriage, but in 1955, she was the voice of Jenny Woodentop in the BBC's Watch With Mother series. She also worked regularly until 1964 as a part-time producer in schools radio.

In 1956 she married Robert Mitchell. She had a son, daughter and three stepchildren.

References
Obituary The Guardian 5 May 1999
Whirlygig TV nostalgia site

1923 births
1999 deaths
British radio personalities